Calvin Christopher Munson (born December 27, 1994) is an American football linebacker for the New England Patriots of the National Football League (NFL). He played college football at San Diego State, and was signed by the New York Giants as an undrafted free agent in 2017.

High school career
Munson attended Francis Howell High School in St. Charles. There he won First-team All-State, First-team All-District linebacker, and Missouri Defensive Player of the Year. He also played baseball during his time with the Vikings being selected by the St. Louis Cardinals in the 31st round 2013 Major League Baseball draft. He was selected to the ABCA/Rawlings High School All-America Baseball Second Team.

College career
Munson did not sign with the Cardinals, instead attending San Diego State University in order to pursue football. There he was twice selected for the First-team All-Mountain West Conference and was two time San Diego State Aztecs football Outstanding Defensive Player of the Year

College statistics

Professional career

New York Giants
Munson signed with the New York Giants as an undrafted free agent following the 2017 NFL Draft. He made the Giants 53-man roster, and made his first career start at middle linebacker in Week 2 in place of an injured B. J. Goodson.

On September 1, 2018, Munson was waived by the Giants and was signed to the practice squad the next day. He was released on September 13, 2018.

New England Patriots
On October 8, 2018, Munson was signed to the New England Patriots' practice squad. Munson won Super Bowl LIII when the Patriots defeated the Los Angeles Rams 13-3. He signed a reserve/future contract with the Patriots on February 5, 2019.

On August 31, 2019, Munson was released during final roster cuts. He was signed to the practice squad the next day.

Miami Dolphins
On December 18, 2019, Munson was signed by the Miami Dolphins off the Patriots practice squad.

Munson was placed on the active/non-football injury list by the Dolphins at the start of training camp on July 28, 2020. He was activated on August 9, 2020.

Munson was given an exclusive-rights free agent tender by the Dolphins on March 8, 2021. He signed the one-year contract on April 14. He was waived on August 31, 2021 and re-signed to the practice squad the next day.

New England Patriots (second stint)
On October 27, 2021, Munson was signed by the New England Patriots off the Dolphins practice squad. He was waived on December 14.

Miami Dolphins (second stint)
On December 15, 2021, Munson was claimed off waivers by the Miami Dolphins.

On August 29, 2022, Munson was placed on injured reserve. He was released on October 10.

New England Patriots (third stint)
On October 12, 2022, Munson was signed to the New England Patriots practice squad. He signed a reserve/future contract on January 10, 2023.

References

External links 

 https://www.sports-reference.com/cfb/players/calvin-munson-1.html

1994 births
Living people
American football linebackers
Miami Dolphins players
New England Patriots players
New York Giants players
People from St. Charles, Missouri
Players of American football from Missouri
San Diego State Aztecs baseball players
San Diego State Aztecs football players
Sportspeople from Greater St. Louis